Chaetacosta vittithorax is a species of beetle in the family Cerambycidae, the only species in the genus Chaetacosta.

References

Acanthocinini